The 2007 Merdeka Tournament is the 39th editions of the Merdeka Tournament and was held on 20 to 29 August 2007.

Groups

Group stage

Group A

Group B

Knockout stage

Semi finals

Finals

Award

External links
 2007 Merdeka Tournament at RSSF.com website

Merdeka Cup
Merdeka Tournament
Merdeka
Merd
Mer